Jenny Berrigan (born 2 September 1983) is a female deaf American snowboarder. She competed at the 2015 Winter Deaflympics.

References 

1983 births
Living people
American female snowboarders
Deaf sportspeople
American deaf people
21st-century American women